is a private junior college in Higashiyodogawa-ku, Osaka, Osaka Prefecture, Japan. The precursor of the school was founded in 1933, and it was chartered as a university in 1951.

See also
 Osaka Seikei University

References

External links 
 Official website 

Educational institutions established in 1933
Private universities and colleges in Japan
Universities and colleges in Osaka
Higashiyodogawa-ku, Osaka
1933 establishments in Japan
Japanese junior colleges